The Metabetchouan River (French: Métabetchouane) is a tributary of Lac Saint-Jean in the centre of the province of Quebec, Canada. The course of this river successively crosses the regional county municipalitys (MRC) of:
 La Jacques-Cartier Regional County Municipality (administrative region of Capitale-Nationale): in the unorganized territory of Lac-Croche;
 La Tuque (administrative region of Mauricie):
 Lac-Saint-Jean-Est Regional County Municipality (administrative region of Saguenay–Lac-Saint-Jean): in the unorganized territory of Lac-Moncouche;
 Le Domaine-du-Roy Regional County Municipality (administrative region of Saguenay–Lac-Saint-Jean): in the municipality of Saint-André-du-Lac-Saint-Jean.

It ends at Desbiens, where a cave called Le trou de la Fée is located.

The river has been dammed for hydroelectric power. Now, it is also a tourist river with rafting, canoeing, and fishing opportunities. It is known for its reserve of fresh-water salmon. In the region of Saguenay-Lac-Saint-Jean, this fish is known as Ouananiche.

This watercourse begins in the Laurentides Wildlife Reserve. The course of this river constitutes:
 the western limit of the territory of the Laurentides Wildlife Reserve, between Lac Long and Métabetchouane Lake;
 the eastern limit of the controlled harvesting zone Zec Kiskissink and the Laurentides Wildlife Reserve;
 the boundary between the municipalities of Lac-Bouchette and Saint-André-du-Lac-Saint-Jean.

The Métabetchouane river valley is mainly accessible by:
 intermediate part: forest road R0279 passing north of Saint-Henri Lake;
 lower part: route 169 along the south shore of lac Saint-Jean, the Trou-de-la-Fée road, the Chambord road, the rang path Saint-Hilaire.

The surface of the Métabetchoune River (except the rapids zones) is usually frozen from the end of November to the beginning of April, however the safe circulation on the ice is generally done from mid-December to the end of March.

Geography 
With an average flow of 47m³/s, it takes its source in the Laurentides Wildlife Reserve. It has several falls, including the "chute à l'Épouvante" (Fall to the Horror) and the Martine Fall.

The main watersheds neighboring the Métabetchouane River are:
 north side: lac Saint-Jean;
 east side: Métabetchouane East River, rivière aux Écorces, Pikauba River, Saguenay River;
 south side: Batiscan River, Jacques-Cartier River;
 west side: Bouchette Lake, Lac des Commissaires, Ouiatchouan River, Ouellet River.

The Métabetchouane river rises at the mouth of Lac des Mâles. This lake is mainly fed by the outlet (coming from the west) of lakes Hansel, Gretel, Petit lac Matteau and lac Matteau.

Upper course of the Métabetchouane river (from its source) (segment of )

  first towards the north, then on  towards the east by crossing the south-eastern part of Lac de la Bouteille, to its mouth;
  towards the north by collecting (coming from the south-east) the outlet of Lac Gazaille, up to the outlet (coming from the east) of Lac Compagnay and Petit Lac Compagnay;
  towards the northwest by forming serpentines in the middle of the segment, until the confluence of the rivière de la Place (coming from the east);
  towards the west by forming a narrow loop towards the west in the marsh area, until the confluence of the Métabetchouane East River (coming from the northeast);
Note: The small Métascouac lake receives from the north the Métascouac River;

Upper course of the Métabetchouane river (downstream of Petit lac Métascouac) (segment of )

  towards the northwest by forming a loop towards the south at the beginning of the segment, then crossing Hugh Lake over its full length, to its mouth;
  northwards crossing Saint-Henri Lake, to its mouth;
  first towards the north passing under the bridge of the forest road R0279, then curving towards the west, and the northwest crossing Lake Long to its mouth;
  towards the northwest by bending to the east at the end of the segment, until the confluence of the Rivière aux Montagnais (coming from the northeast);
  to the west by forming two detours to the north, up to Naquagami bay (eastern part of Métabetchouane Lake);
  towards the northwest by crossing Métabetchouane Lake over its full length, up to its mouth;

Intermediate course of the Métabetchouane river (downstream of Métabetchouane lake) (segment of )

  to the north by collecting the discharge (coming from the northwest) from Lac du Vison, Georgette and Muskrat, forming a loop to the north to go around a mountain by crossing rapids , and a second loop where it collecting the discharge (coming from the east) of the lake of Félins, and collecting at the end of the segment the discharge (coming from the southwest) of the lakes Honorat and the Mares, up to the confluence of the rivière à la Chute (coming from the northwest);
  towards the south-east by forming a curve towards the north to bypass a mountain, then curving towards the north-east by forming a detour towards the west where it crosses rapids, making a curve towards the east, to the confluence of the Rivière de la Chaîne (coming from the northwest);
  first towards the north, then by bending towards the northeast, collecting at the end of the segment the discharge (coming from the west) from Lake Pichou and the discharge from Lac des Two Clubs, up to the outlet of Lake Huard (coming from the southeast);
  northwards to Rivière aux Canots (coming from the east);

Intermediate course of the Métabetchouane river (downstream of the Rivière aux Canots) (segment of )

  towards the northwest by collecting the Black stream (coming from the southwest) at the beginning of the segment, curving towards the west crossing a long series of rapids and forming a loop towards the north, up to the Carcajou stream (coming from the south);
  towards the northwest by forming a hook towards the north crossing the White Fall and several rapids, up to the Louise stream (coming from the northeast);
  towards the northwest by forming a loop towards the southwest at the start of the segment, up to the outlet (coming from the northeast) from Petit lac à la Carpe;
  north-west until the confluence of the Carpe River;

Lower course of the Métabetchouane river (segment of )

  north-east passing in front of the village of Saint-André-du-Lac-Saint-Jean, up to the Prudent River (coming from South);
  first towards the north-east until mid-segment, then towards the north passing in front of the hamlet "La Martine" and bypassing Île à Ringuette, to the confluence of the Grande Rivière Désir (coming from the west);
  to the east by crossing a dike, then a few rapids, to a bend in the river;
  to the north in a deep valley crossing Martine Falls, forming a detour west to go around a mountain, passing on the east side of the Twin Mountains and crossing on  the bay of Villa-des-Érables, passing under the bridge of route 169 and under the railway bridge of Canadian National, up to at its mouth. Note: The MacDonald River flows onto the east shore of this bay.

At its mouth on the south shore of lac Saint-Jean, the Métabetchouane river forms a small lake, between the village of Chambord to the west and Desbiens to the east.

From the mouth of the Métabetchouane river on the south shore of lac Saint-Jean, the current crosses the latter on  towards the northeast, then follows the course of the Saguenay River via La Petite Décharge on  until Tadoussac where it merges with the Saint Lawrence estuary.

Toponymy 
Its name is of Innu origin, but cognates exist in other Cree and Anishinabe dialects. From the roots matabi and djiwan (spelled matapetshuan in the modern Innu orthography), it can be translated as "river that empties into a lake".

History 

The mouth of the river may have been a seasonal Innu camp for thousands of years and the river itself was used as a route between Lake Saint-Jean and the Quebec City region. Important archaeological excavations on the banks of the river led, in the 1960s, to the discovery of a site frequented by the Amerindians since approximately 5000 years. In 1647, Jean de Quen was the first European to visit the place but his report did not make mention of the river. Some two decades later in 1676, the first reference was made of this river as Metabeki8an in the second register of Tadoussac. A French trading post was erected at its mouth in 1676. That same year, Jesuits established the Saint-Charles Mission at the river's mouth. In the mid 19th century, William Price began logging along the length of the river and it was used for a long time for log driving.

See also
List of rivers of Quebec

References 

Rivers of Capitale-Nationale
Rivers of Saguenay–Lac-Saint-Jean
Laurentides Wildlife Reserve